Ross Clayton McBurney (July 29, 1906 – July 4, 1988) was an American basketball player.  A 6'5" center, McBurney attended Wichita East High School, where he led the team to a national high school championship in 1925.  He then attended Wichita State University from 1926 to 1929, where he became the school's first basketball All-American in 1927.  That year he led the Shockers to a 19-2 record and a third-place finish in the Amateur Athletic Union tournament.  He was also named to the AAU All-American team that year.

Following his college career, McBurney had a long and successful AAU career.  He went to 10 AAU championship tournaments, winning three consecutive national titles with Henry's Clothiers of Wichita in 1930 to 1932 and again earning AAU All-American honors in 1929.  After five seasons with Henry's, McBurney played for Ogden, Hutchinson, Kansas and Golden State Creamery of Oakland, California.

References

External links
Wichita State HOF profile

1906 births
1988 deaths
All-American college men's basketball players
Amateur Athletic Union men's basketball players
American men's basketball players
Basketball players from Wichita, Kansas
Centers (basketball)
Wichita State Shockers men's basketball players